Samuel Abt (born 1934) is an American sports journalist and author who covered professional cycling for 31 years,  publishing articles in the New York Times and International Herald Tribune, among others. He devoted much time to chronicling the careers of English-speaking riders, especially Lance Armstrong and Greg LeMond.

Abt wrote 10 books on professional cycling, including In High Gear: The World of Professional Bicycle Racing, Lemond: The Incredible Comeback of an American Hero, and the acclaimed Breakaway: On the Road with the Tour de France. According to VeloPress, "He is the only American to have been awarded the medal of the Tour de France for distinguished service to the race."

In 1971, while working at the New York Times, Abt helped edit the Pentagon Papers.

Abt is retired and lives in a suburb of Paris.  He is a graduate of Brown University.

References 
Citations

Bibliography

 Abt, Samuel "LeMond: The Incredible Comeback" (1990) Random House, New York, NY, 

Living people
1934 births
Cycling journalists
Cycling writers
American expatriates in France
American information and reference writers